Tanzila Aamir Cheema is a Pakistani politician who served as member of the National Assembly of Pakistan.

Political career
She was elected to the National Assembly of Pakistan as a candidate of Pakistan Muslim League (Q) on a seat reserved for women from Punjab in the 2002 Pakistani general election.

She was re-elected to the National Assembly of Pakistan as a candidate of Pakistan Muslim League (Q) on a seat reserved for women from Punjab in 2011.

References

Pakistani MNAs 2002–2007
Women members of the National Assembly of Pakistan
Pakistani MNAs 2008–2013
21st-century Pakistani women politicians